D. spectabilis may refer to:

Dipodomys spectabilis, the banner-tailed kangaroo rat, a rodent species
Discopus spectabilis, a beetle species
Donuca spectabilis, a moth species
Dryotriorchis spectabilis, the Congo serpent eagle, a bird species